Calanda may refer to:

 Calanda, Spain, a town in Aragon, Spain
 Calanda (mountain) in Graubünden, Switzerland
 Calanda Bräu, a brewery in Chur, Switzerland, now owned by Heineken International
 Calanda (plant), a genus of the family Rubiaceae

See also
 Foz-Calanda, a town in the province of Teruel, Aragon, Spain
 Samper de Calanda, a town in the province of Teruel, Aragon, Spain